Crum Creek is a former railroad spur along the St. Louis and San Francisco Railway in Pushmataha County, Oklahoma, United States, 14 miles southwest of Tuskahoma.

A United States Post Office operated here from February 9, 1916, to July 30, 1927. The railroad spur took its name from nearby Crum Creek, a branch of the Kiamichi River, which in turn took its name from a local resident. 

More information on Crum Creek and the Kiamichi River valley may be found in the Pushmataha County Historical Society.

References

External links

Geography of Pushmataha County, Oklahoma
Ghost towns in Oklahoma